Kannika Sitthipaet ((born ) is a Thai female volleyball player. She was part of the Thailand U-20 women's national volleyball team.

Club 

  Ayutthaya A.T.C.C (2012–2015)
  Khonkaen Star (2015–present)

Awards

Clubs 

 2014 Thai–Denmark Super League -  Champion, with Ayutthaya A.T.C.C
 2015 Thai–Denmark Super League -  Third, with Idea Khonkaen
 2016 Thai–Denmark Super League -  Third, with Idea Khonkaen
 2019 Thai–Denmark Super League -  Third, with Thai-Denmark Khonkaen Star
 2020 Thailand League –  Runner-up, with Khonkaen Star

References

External links 

 Profile at FIVB.org

Living people
Kannika Sitthipaet
Place of birth missing (living people)
Year of birth missing (living people)
Kannika Sitthipaet
Kannika Sitthipaet